Tang Mohr (also known as Tang Mehr-e Jonūbī) is a village in Mohr Rural District, in the Central District of Mohr County, Fars Province, Iran. At the 2006 census, its population was 51, in 10 families.

References 

Populated places in Mohr County